Vitaly Viktorovich Peskov (May 12, 1944 – March 12, 2002) was a Russian cartoonist who also worked as an illustrator and an animation director.

In 2000, Vitaly Peskov was recognized as the best Russian caricaturist of the 20th century (according to the magazine “Faces” (ru: Лица) published in Russia). He was a cartoonist of the democratic trend and did not serve the Soviet Communist authorities. As a result, he was summoned to the KGB, he did not publish personal books of his works and had no personal exhibitions.

In all, Peskov authored about 15,000 cartoons. His first cartoon was published in Smena in 1967, after which he was invited to the Literaturnaya Gazeta. In the following years, he worked for a variety of other publications. However, Peskov's cartoons never had an official support by the Soviet authorities, and unlike with other well-known artists, no exhibition of Peskov's works had ever been organized during his life.

Vitaly Peskov, during his lifetime, issued copyright for his works to his wife Irina Korshikova. She later wrote in her memoirs: he was afraid that outsiders (KGB) would get his drawings and wrote powers of attorney for his wife.

After Peskov's death in 2002, his apartment was looted. 
 
Official structures of Russia began to pursue Vitaly Peskov's family, and his drawings, including political cartoons as his widow considers, were destroyed. And his wife Irina Korshikova with her son Viktor Korshikov (1983-2006) received numerous threats and emigrated to the United States soon after.

One month after Peskov's death, an exhibition of three hundred cartoons was organized by Leonid Tishkov in his private gallery in Moscow. The questions of how Tishkov got a hold of the stolen cartoons and where the remaining drawings and other property are was never answered. Leonid Tishkov is the younger brother of a Communist and a high-ranking official Valery Tishkov.

The widow of Vitaly Peskov, Irina Korshikova, who emigrated to the United States with the copies of 3,000 of Peskov's drawings, held two exhibitions of her husband's cartoons on Broadway in New York (2004 and 2005) and later created a commemorative website and published his biography To Vitaly from Irina (Mir Collection NY, 2007, ; available at ).

In the meanwhile, the threats and harassment against the artist's family continued. Three hundred drawings re-appeared in Moscow in various publications and at exhibitions attended by Russian artists and senior officials of the Moscow Government and the Ministry of Culture. Even though a criminal case was opened, it was stalled, allegedly due to corruption. In relation to this, Viktor Korshikov, a musical critic and writer and an author of various articles on the history of opera, committed suicide. No arrests have ever been made.

Filmography
Vitaly Peskov is the author of several animated films (director & artist filmography):
Cowboys in town (ru: «Ковбои в городе» online) (1973)
Mayakovsky laughs (ru: «Маяковский смеется») (1975; director Sergei Yutkevich)
It's in the Bag (ru: «Дело в шляпе», 1975)
A Stadium topsy-turvy (ru: «Стадион шиворот-навыворот») (1976)
To You — attacker class! (ru: «Тебе — атакующий класс!») (1977)
an animated film-parody to film-comedy The Irony of Fate (1975)
Dima hits the road (ru: «Дима отправляется в путь») (1978)
a film-parody Pif-paf, oï-oï-oï! (ru: «Пиф-паф, ой-ой-ой!»), with Garri Bardin (Пиф-паф, ой-ой-ой online)
the drawings comic in the film The dear boy (ru: «Дорогой мальчик»)

Selected works

References

1944 births
2002 deaths
Russian caricaturists
Russian cartoonists
Russian illustrators
Russian animators
Russian animated film directors